Dasychira styx is a species of erebid moths in the subfamily Lymantriinae. It was described by George Thomas Bethune-Baker in 1911. Its type locality is in Angola.

References

Endemic fauna of Angola
Lymantriinae
Moths described in 1911
Moths of Africa
Taxa named by George Thomas Bethune-Baker